The Road Show is a Canadian music variety television miniseries which aired on CBC Television in 1977.

Premise
This series was a mid-season replacement for The Tommy Hunter Show. Colleen Peterson and Rick Neufeld hosted this follow-up four-episode series which was recorded in the Prairie provinces. Regulars included humourist Peter Paul Van Camp and the Prairie Dog Band of which Neufeld was a member.

The series was a spin-off from an episode of the regional CBC series Points West which featured a concert recorded at Winnipeg's Stoney Mountain Penitentiary.

Scheduling
This hour-long series was broadcast Fridays at 9:00 p.m. Eastern from 3 to 24 June 1977.

Episodes
 Brandon, Manitoba: Ian Tyson and the community's Royal Winter Fair were featured
 Banff, Alberta:  Dick Damron and Len Udow were featured at the School of Fine Arts
 Shilo, Manitoba: Buck Evans was featured at CFB Shilo
 Prince Albert, Saskatchewan: Roosevelt Sykes was featured at that community's maximum security jail

References

External links
 

CBC Television original programming
1977 Canadian television series debuts
1977 Canadian television series endings
1970s Canadian variety television series
1970s Canadian music television series